Prince Joseph Ferdinand of Saxe-Coburg and Gotha (full name Joseph Ferdinand Maria Michael Gabriel Raphael Gonzaga; 21 May 1869 – 13 August 1888), known in Brazil as Dom José Fernando, was a prince of the House of Saxe-Coburg and Gotha-Koháry. Born in Leopoldina Palace, Rio de Janeiro, he was the third son of Prince Ludwig August of Saxe-Coburg and Gotha and his wife Princess Leopoldina of Brazil. He died of pneumonia at the age of 19 in Wiener Neustadt and is buried at St. Augustin, Coburg.

Bibliography

 Lessa, Clado Ribeiro de. O Segundo Ramo da Casa Imperial e a nossa Marinha de Guerra, in Revista do Instituto Historico e Geografico Brasileiro, vol. 211, 1951, p. 118-133 (ISSN 0101-4366)

Ancestry

References

1869 births
1888 deaths
People from Rio de Janeiro (city)
House of Saxe-Coburg-Gotha-Koháry
Princes of Saxe-Coburg and Gotha
Deaths from pneumonia in Austria-Hungary